Penuganchiprolu mandal is one of the 20 mandals in the NTR district of the Indian state of Andhra Pradesh. It is known for Sri Lakshmi Tirupathamma Temple, located alongside the Muneru River. People from both states visit this devotional place on Fridays and Sundays. This village is also known for its farmers and profitable agriculture. It has one public police station, public hospital and public schools

List of Villages...

Anigandlapadu

Gummadidurru

Kollikulla

Konakanchi

Lingagudem

Muchintala @ Bodapadu

Mundlapadu

Nawabpeta

Penuganchiprolu

Sanagapadu

Subbayagudem

Thotacherla

Venkatapuram.

.

References 

Mandals in NTR district